Ann John is a Professor in Public Health and Psychiatry at the Swansea University Medical School. She chairs the National Advisory Group to Welsh Government on the prevention of suicide and self-harm. She is an honorary consultant in Public Health medicine for Public Health Wales and Trustee of the Mental Health Foundation

Education 
John's parents arrived in London from Kerala in 1966. She was born and grew up in London. She was educated at Haberdashers' Aske's School for Girls and then Charing Cross and Westminster Medical School where she qualified as a doctor. During her medical degree she intercalated to study sociology, which began an interest in inequality. She earned a Medical Doctorate at Swansea University in 2011, where she established a Suicide and Self-Harm research group.

Career 
She moved to Swansea as a junior doctor, where she worked in accident and emergency at Morriston Hospital. John has been a general practitioner, a medical advisor to the Driver and Vehicle Licensing Agency and a Clinical Assistant in Psychiatry. She is now an academic researcher and has contributed considerably to research into children and young people's mental health and suicide and self-harm prevention.

Mental health, including prevention of suicide and self-harm
Her expertise lie in epidemiology, suicide and mental disorders. She is a Principal Investigator with the National Centre for Mental Health, where she leads the informatics group. She is a Farr Institute Investigator where uses big data to understand mental health in young people. In 2017, after looking at data on psychotropic prescribing from over 300,000 patients aged between 6 and 18 years old, guidance was issued on managing depression and antidepressant prescribing to children and young people (in particular citalopram) and access to talking therapies.

John's Adolescent Data Platform, funded by MQ, is the biggest of its kind for young people's mental health. It brings together scientists from several universities, aiming to make it easier for young people to access quality mental health services. She received an Arts Council of Wales grant to partner with an artist and help young people express what they are thinking. She worked with Self-Harm Research UK (SHARE) to better understand and support people who self-harm.

She developed the Wales strategy for suicide and self-harm. She is particularly concerned about cyberbullying and the impacts it has on young people. In 2018 she found victims of cyberbullying are more than twice as likely to enact suicidal behaviour.

In 2022 John was part of a group examining the use of machine learning in suicide prevention.

References 

British general practitioners
Academics of Swansea University
Mental health activists
Living people
Year of birth missing (living people)